Stereospermum is a genus of trees in the paleotropical clade of the family Bignoniaceae. A species of Stereospermum (S. chelonoides) is used in herbal medicine in Ayurveda as well as it is an integral part of the culture and tradition of the cold desert biosphere reserve.

Species
Species include:
Stereospermum acuminatissimum K.Schum.
Stereospermum angustifolium Haines
Stereospermum annamense Dop
Stereospermum arcuatum H.Perrier
Stereospermum boivini (Baill.) H.Perrier
Stereospermum chelonoides (L.f.) DC.
Stereospermum cylindricum Pierre ex Dop
Stereospermum binhchauensis VS Dang
Stereospermum euphorioides DC.
Stereospermum fimbriatum (Wall. ex G.Don) DC.
Stereospermum harmsianum K.Schum.
Stereospermum hildebrandtii (Baill.) H.Perrier
Stereospermum kunthianum Cham.
Stereospermum leonense Sprague
Stereospermum longiflorum Capuron
Stereospermum nematocarpum (Bojer) DC.
Stereospermum neuranthum Kurz
Stereospermum rhoifolium (Baill.) H.Perrier
Stereospermum strigilosum C.Y.Wu
Stereospermum tetragonum DC.
Stereospermum tomentosum H.Perrier
Stereospermum undatum H.Perrier
Stereospermum variabile H.Perrier
Stereospermum zenkeri K.Schum. ex De Wild.

References

 
Bignoniaceae genera